Yu Jae-yu (born 3 March 1997) is a South Korean professional baseball pitcher who plays for the Doosan Bears of the KBO League. His cousin Go Woo-suk pitches for the LG Twins.

Career records

References 

1997 births
Living people
Doosan Bears players
KBO League pitchers
People from Incheon
Sportspeople from Incheon